Arthur Sperry Pearse (1877–1956) was a botanist and zoologist from the United States. He was born at a Pawnee people reserve in Crete, Nebraska, where his parents had a commercial outpost. He earn a BA at the University of Nebraska in 1900 and a MA, at the same university in 1904. Pearse received his Ph.D. in zoology from Harvard University in 1908, with a dissertation entitled "The Reaction of Amphibians to Light". After earning his PH.D he taught at the University of Michigan and later he became part of the faculty at the University of Wisconsin. In 1926, he became the president of the Ecological Society of America. He joined the Biology Department of Duke University in 1927. Here he founded Ecological Monographs, that was the first science journal from the Duke University Press. In 1935, a new Zoology Department was created under the leadership of Pearse. He later play a significant role in the creation of the Marine Laboratory in Beaufort, North Carolina, where he was the Director from 1938 to 1945. He retired in 1948. 

Frog Elachistocleis pearsei is named after Pearse.

References

1877 births
1956 deaths
American botanists
American zoologists
People from Crete, Nebraska
Harvard University alumni
University of Nebraska alumni
University of Michigan faculty
University of Wisconsin–Madison faculty
Duke University faculty